ArchDaily is a weblog covering architectural news, projects, products, events, interviews and competitions, opinion pieces, among others, catering to architects, designers and other interested parties.

It is currently based in Santiago, with offices in Berlin, Shanghai, and Mexico City.

Description 
ArchDaily is one of the most popular architecture websites worldwide, with 17.9 million monthly readers and about 283 million page views per month as of 2022.

Founded in March 2008 by Chilean architects David Basulto and David Assael, ArchDaily includes three regional websites in Spanish (Plataforma Arquitectura, ArchDaily México, ArchDaily Colombia, and ArchDaily Perú), Portuguese (ArchDaily Brasil), and Chinese (ArchDaily China).
It has a partnership with the Pritzker Architecture Prize and was one of five finalists for the Best Online Magazine prize on Mashable's 2009 Open Web Awards.

In 2020, ArchDaily was acquired by Swiss media company NZZ Mediengruppe. Even though the purchase details have not officially been disclosure, estimations have put the price tag around €10 million

Staff and contributors 
As of 2023, the site's Chief Executive Officer is Stephan Bachmann, the editor-in-chief is David Basulto, while Clara Ott serves as Projects Manager and Nicolas Valencia as Editorial Manager

Building of the Year Awards 
Annually, ArchDaily organizes the Building of the Year Awards, with winners chosen by a vote of the 60,000 architects who are members of the site.

References

External links 
 

Architecture websites
Internet properties established in 2008